The brown wrasse (Labrus merula) is a species of wrasse native to the Eastern Atlantic from Portugal to Morocco, including the Azores, as well as in the Mediterranean Sea.

Description

Body is moderately elongated, head is broad, shorter or equal to the body depth, with light blue spots. It has strong, canine-like teeth which are  rounded in older specimens.

Young specimens are green or brownish with light spots, belly is paler, yellow-greyish. Some specimens have a blue-white longitudinal stripe on sides. Old specimens are dark blue, sometimes dark green or brownish. Soft part of dorsal, anal and caudal fins are outlined with light blue stripe.

Smaller specimens form small, loose schools, but larger and older specimens are found solitary.

It feeds on sea urchins, ophiuroids, mollusks, crabs and worms.

Maximum age is around 16–17 years.

This species spawns from February to May in the western Mediterranean Sea. Demersal eggs are laid amongst rocks and seagrasses and are protected by the males.

It is important to local populations as a food fish and can also be found in the aquarium trade.

Distribution and Habitat
The brown wrasse can be found in Eastern Atlantic from Portugal to Morocco, including the Azores, as well as in the Mediterranean Sea, throughout the entire area except for the eastern Levantine and Black Sea.

Threats to this species include habitat degradation, specifically the reduction of Posidonia seagrass beds, however, the population has not shown any serious signs of decline.

Fishing
In artisanal fishing it is often caught in small quantities using nets and longlines, all year long, but much better from the Spring to the end of the Autumn.

In recreational fishing it is often caught on rod and reel and on the handline. As bait, various worms and crabs can be used, as well as small chunks of fish.

When found in the shallows, it can be caught using a speargun, especially larger specimens.

Cuisine
Meat is soft, tender, easy to digest and very tasty. 
It can be prepared in numerous ways, but it is best barbequed and served with some olive oil, lemon juice, garlic and parsley. Also, it can be boiled or prepared as part of mixed fish stew. Small specimens are fried.

References

External links

 Review of Croatian selected scientific literature on species mostly exploited by the national small-scale fisheries PDF file on FAOAdriaMed.org
 

Labrus
Fish described in 1758
Fish of Africa
Fish of the Atlantic Ocean
Fish of Europe
Fish of the Mediterranean Sea
Taxa named by Carl Linnaeus